Karl Zaruba (December 29, 1902 – October 5, 1978 ) was an Austrian composer and conductor, founder of the Neue Meister Deutsch Kapelle (Neue Deutschmeister Band).

He was the conductor of the Austrian Folk Musicians and director of the Schuhplattler Dance Band

Discography
The Merry Yodeler, (Musical LP, 1953, director)
The Merry Yodeler, Volume II (Musical LP, 1953, director)
Folk Dances of Austria, Vol. 3: Traditional Schuhplattler Dances, (LP 1962, director)
The Neue Deutschmeister Band in Stereo (Neue Deutschmeister Band, Elektra EKS 7101 (Stereo), Released: 1958, conductor)

Compositions

For the Kapelle
 Liebe Anna!
  Der Kirchschlager
 Am Brigitta Kirtag
 Bluembachtaler Schuhplattler
 Dachauer Schuhplattler
 Der Eiswalzer
 Der Jajermarsch
 Der Offene Walzer
 Edelweisser
 Enzianer Schuhplattler
 Heidauer Schuhplattler
 Kuckucks-Polka
 Mit Schwung, mars
 Petersdorfer Ländler
 Reit im Winkel
 Steffel von Talgau Schuhplattler
 Trauntalern Schuhplattler
 Watschenplattler

For small ensembles
 Das Blumerl
 Das Hiatamadl
 Das Spinnrad
 Der Cevve
 Der Deutsche Umgang
 Der Haxenschmeisser
 Der Neudeutsche
 Der Siebenschritt
 Der Waldjager
 Die Ennstaler Polka
 Die Mainzer Polka
 Kreuzpolka
 Marching Polka
 Neubayrische
 Nickelsdorfer-Schottisch
 Reidlinger Schottische
 Rheinlander
 Steyrische Kreuzpolka
 Studentenpolka
 Weifentanz

References

1902 births
1978 deaths
Austrian male composers
Austrian composers
Male conductors (music)
20th-century Austrian conductors (music)
20th-century Austrian male musicians
20th-century Austrian composers